Dagfin is a given name. Notable people with the given name include:

Dagfin Huseby (1922–2010), Norwegian wrestler
Dagfin Juel (1909–1985), Norwegian civil servant and politician
Dagfin Werenskiold (1892–1977), Norwegian sculptor and painter

Norwegian masculine given names